Mississinewa Lake Dam is a dam in Miami County, Indiana, just outside the town of Peru, in the central part of the state.

Authorization and construction
The dam was among those authorized by the 1958 Flood Control Act. The dam was designed and built by the Louisville district of the United States Army Corps of Engineers. It impounds the Mississinewa River for irrigation storage and flood control. The dam is owned and operated by the Great Lakes and Ohio River Division of the Corps of Engineers.

Reservoir
Mississinewa Lake operates in conjunction with the J. Edward Roush and Salamonie lakes to prevent flooding downstream in the lower Wabash and Ohio rivers. Recreation includes fishing, boating, and swimming. Nearby recreation areas include the Miami State Recreation Area, the Red Bridge State Recreation Area, the Pearson Mill State Recreation Area, and the Frances Slocum State Recreation Area.

References 

Dams in Indiana
Reservoirs in Indiana
United States Army Corps of Engineers dams
Dams completed in 1967
Bodies of water of Miami County, Indiana